, is a Japanese manga series written and illustrated by Mao Nanami. The series was serialized in Kodansha's Dessert between July 2011 and May 2016, with the series later being compiled into twelve tankōbon volumes released between December 2011 and August 2016. The series is currently published digitally in English by Kodansha Comics. An anime television series adaptation directed by Takashi Naoya and animated by Hoods Entertainment aired from April 4 to June 20, 2018 on  AnichU programming block. A second season aired from January 8 to March 26, 2019.

Plot
High-school student Hikari Tsutsui is unpopular with classmates for his otaku behavior. One day, he is sentenced to pool cleaning duty for being late, and is paired with the beautiful but reputed troublemaker Iroha Igarashi. When Iroha asks if he would like to be in a relationship with her, Hikari agrees. However, there is a catch: Iroha is moving in six months, owing to her father's work, and transferring to another school as a result.

Characters

Portrayed by: Ayami Nakajo (live-action)
Iroha is a beautiful girl (considered by Yuto Ito and Sumie Ayado to be "the perfect 3D Girl") but is a well-known delinquent. She initially encounters Hikari after being assigned to clean the pool with him. She begins to like Hikari and eventually agrees to be his girlfriend but tells him she has to move away in six months. She is kind-hearted and takes the relationship seriously and stands up to those who look down on him and their relationship. It is later revealed that she has a brain tumor and requires surgery, later making her gain retrograde amnesia.

Portrayed by: Hayato Sano (live-action)
 Hikari Tsutsui is third-year high school student who has been stigmatized by his classmates for being an otaku. As a result, he isolates himself from the rest, his only friend being the oddball and fellow otaku Yūto Itō. He initially disliked Iroha for being the personification of everything he disliked about 3D girls. Although he initially turned Iroha down, he decided to try a relationship with her.

Portrayed by: Yutaro (live-action)
 Hikari's best and only friend, who wears a cat-ear headband. He supports Hikari's relationship and hopes someday he too can develop a relationship.

Portrayed by: Yuri Tsunematsu (live-action)
 Arisa is Hikari and Iroha's classmate who is initially annoyed by Hikari, but is relied upon regularly to give Hikari relationship advice. At first she has a boyfriend, but when Hikari points out that he is taking advantage of her, Arisa eventually breaks up with him. She becomes friends with Hikari and Iroha, and when she meets Mitsuya for the first time, she instantly falls for him.

Portrayed by: Hiroya Shimizu (live-action)
Mitsuya is a popular guy in school, and has his eyes on Iroha. He cannot admit, though, that a guy like Hikari is her boyfriend. One day he sees Hikari helping his sister Anzu stand after falling; he tells her to scream, catching the attention of the police and branding Hikari as a lolicon for days. Iroha found out the truth later through Anzu herself, and they apologize to Hikari.

Portrayed by: Moka Kamishiraishi (live-action)
 A clumsy, outspoken glasses-wearing girl who bumps into Hikari and is attracted to him as they share otaku interests. She also idolizes Iroha.

 Ezomichi is the name of a magical girl character in Hikari's favorite anime show. She would often talk to Hikari in his imagination whenever he is seeking questions concerning him and Iroha. Ezomichi has a larger role in the anime series.

Media

Manga
The manga series was serialized in Kodansha's Dessert between July 2011 and May 2016, with the series later being compiled into twelve tankōbon volumes released between December 2011 and August 2016. Kodansha later republished the series with new cover designs from August 2017 to November 2017. Kodansha Comics announced on May 16, 2017 that they would publish the manga digitally in English, with the first volume being released on May 30, 2017, and the final volume being released on January 30, 2018.

Volume list
English release dates and ISBNs are for the digital version. Chapters are numbered as episodes, for example: episode・19

Anime
An anime television series adaptation was announced in November 2017. The series is directed by Takashi Naoya and written by Deko Akao, with animation by Hoods Entertainment and character designs by Satomi Kurita. It aired from April 4 to June 20, 2018 on Nippon TV's AnichU programming block. The series ran for 12 episodes. The first season was released on Blu-ray/DVD in four compilations, each containing one disc with three episodes, by VAP between June 27 and September 26, 2018. On June 19, 2018, the anime official website tweeted plans for a second anime season that aired from January 8 to March 26, 2019. The cast and staff reprised their roles. The second season ran for 12 episodes.

In March 2018, Sentai Filmworks licensed the anime for an English-language release and simulcasted it on Hidive for the United States, Canada, Australia, New Zealand, the United Kingdom, Ireland, South Africa, the Netherlands, the Nordics, Spain, Portugal, and Latin America. In July 2018, Sentai Filmworks announced plans to record an English-language dub for the series. The dub began streaming on October 30, 2018.

Two pieces of theme music are used.

Season 1

Season 2

Live-action film

A live-action film adaptation directed by Tsutomu Hanabusa and distributed by Warner Bros. was released in Japanese theaters on September 14, 2018.

Reception

In reviewing the anime's first season, Paul Jensen of Anime News Network criticized the animation quality for the first three episodes as "mediocre". However, he praised the storyline and characterizations between Iroha and Hikari. For the final episode, Jensen said that Iroha and Hikari's chemistry was the episode's "saving grace". Although he felt that the season overall "wasted far too much time trying to spice up the drama", Jensen said that it "wasn't terrible, but it never made the most of its strengths".

Notes

References

External links
 Official manga website 
 Official anime website 
 

Anime series based on manga
Hoods Entertainment
Kodansha manga
Manga adapted into films
Manga adapted into television series
Romantic comedy anime and manga
Sentai Filmworks
Shōjo manga